The Kasepuhan Banten Kidul are a traditional Sundanese community of approximately 5,300 people, who live in the southern part of Gunung Halimun National Park, in the Indonesian province of West Java. Gunung Halimun National Park is located within the borders of the Sukabumi Regency, Bogor and southern Banten province. The Kasepuhan is called "Kasepuhan Banten Kidul" (Kasepuhan of Southern Banten), their main village is Ciptagelar in the Cisolok subdistrict (kecamatan) in the western part of the Sukabumi Regency. The current head of the community, Abah Ugih, inherited the position of leader when his father, Abah Anom, died at the age of 54.

Etymology
The word kasepuhan is formed on sepuh, which means "old" in the Sundanese language. It refers to a way of living based on ancestral traditions and eventually, to the local community who lives according to these traditions.

History and tradition

According to oral information, the Kasepuhan have lived in this area (Banten Kidul, or south Banten) since 1368.   The ancestors of the Kasepuhan are said to have lived in the area of Bogor, east of Gunung Halimun. At that time, their ancestors were part of a kingdom that encompassed the province of West Java and Banten.

The people of the Kasepuhan claim they are linked with the Baduy, another traditional group in West Java. The main belief system of Kasepuhan people is Sunda Wiwitan. Nowadays, the Kasepuhan are influenced by Islam.  However they do not strictly follow all rules of Islam but, rather, combine their beliefs with animism and Sundanese traditions. Just as their ancestors, they have combined several traditions and religions with their own Kasepuhan tradition; that is, they are influenced by Islam, Sundanese traditions, Pajajaran traditions and thus Hinduism and also animism.

The main ritual of Kasepuhan community is Seren Taun, or rice harvest thanksgiving as well as marking the new agriculture year in Sundanese tradition. Seren Taun festival is also celebrated by other Sundanese traditional communities in other areas such as Sundanese community in Cigugur Kuningan.

The Kasepuhan history existed since 1368 (note: the years allowed to write down) their believe before that time also they still have story, but enough to lets other peoples known only from that time.
the areas of the kingdom called " Banten Kidul" its a territories  before the government age, and now this Banten Kidul area on three sub district areas ( Lebak, Bogor and Sukabumi)
The peoples in Kasepuhan still living in the tradition and ancient cultures role of custom, following what the ancestor said for their life and living on rice plantation. the rice they have to plan is only rice seed from the ancestor ( data 2014: there are 167 original varieties) planting till today, and more than 300 new varieties from natural mixing on the rice field.

By far the most important way of subsistence for the Kasepuhan is agriculture, which can split into two categories: Huma (Dry rice cultivation), Sawah (wet rice cultivation). the Dry system rice plantation is the original way plantation from the ancestor, and since the Dutch time then they have wets system rice plantation called "Sawah".

About 85% of Kasepuhan agricultural land is sawah, 10% consists of ladang, and 5% kebun.  There is a strong emphasis on eco-friendly techniques of farming within the community.and the other land is Forestry, living in the forest also message from the ancestor to keep the tradition safely, make distance with the city from outside influence, they have three categories forestry for : Leuweung  Tutupan (forbidden forest), Leuweung Titipan (forbidden forest) and Leuweung Garapan ( the plots forest), and the peoples living in the plots lands

See also 
Ciptagelar

References

External links 
Bas Bolman (2006). Wet rice cultivation in Indonesia - A comparative research on differences in modernisation trends. Major Thesis, Wageningen University.
West Java
Sundanese culture
Anthropology